Enschede (known as   in the local Twents dialect) is a municipality and city in the eastern Netherlands in the province of Overijssel and in the Twente region. The eastern parts of the urban area reaches the border of the German city of Gronau. 

The municipality of Enschede consisted of the city of Enschede until 1935, when the rural municipality of Lonneker, which surrounded the city, was annexed after the rapid industrial expansion of Enschede which began in the 1860s and involved the building of railways and the digging of the Twentekanaal. The proposal for consolidation began in 1872, per the Tubantia newspaper article on 22 June 1872 that referenced a committee of 5 to oversee a study.  They were: J. Mosman (Johannes Theodorus Mosman), H. Fikkert, H. G. Blijdenstein J. Bz., C. C. Schleucker, and G. J. van Heek.

In sports and culture, Enschede is known for being home to football club FC Twente, one-time Dutch champions, and the University of Twente.

The municipality of Enschede works together in the Twente Region and has been a participant in the EUREGIO, the first regional cross-border partnership in Europe, since its foundation in 1958.

Geography 
Enschede lies in the eastern part of Overijssel and is the easternmost city of more than 140,000 inhabitants in the Netherlands. The city lies a few kilometres from Germany, which borders the municipality. A few small rivers flow through or surround the city, such as the Roombeek and Glanerbeek.

Enschede contains five official city districts ("Stadsdelen"). Note that they also include surrounding villages in the municipality:
 Stadsdeel Centrum (Binnenstad, Boddenkamp, De Bothoven, 't Getfert, Hogeland Noord, Horstlanden-Veldkamp, Laares, Lasonder-'t Zeggelt)
 Stadsdeel Noord (for example: Lonneker, Deppenbroek, Bolhaar, Mekkelholt, Roombeek, Twekkelerveld)
 Stadsdeel Oost (for example: Wooldrik, Velve-Lindenhof, De Eschmarke, ’t Ribbelt, Stokhorst, Dolphia, ’t Hogeland and Glanerbrug)
 Stadsdeel Zuid (Wesselerbrink, Helmerhoek and Stroinkslanden)
 Stadsdeel West (Boswinkel, Ruwenbos, Pathmos, Stadsveld, Bruggert, ’t Zwering, ’t Havengebied, De Marssteden, Boekelo, Usselo and Twekkelo)

Climate 

Like most of the Netherlands, Enschede features an oceanic climate (Cfb in the Köppen classification), however, winters tend to be less mild than the rest of the Netherlands due to its inland location. Although the former military airport is derelict and plans to revive the place were canceled in 2012, the Royal Netherlands Meteorological Institute still maintains a weather station there.

History

Preindustrial Era 

The early history of Enschede is largely unknown, but a settlement existed around the Old Marketplace in early medieval times. The name of this settlement is mentioned as Anescede or Enscede meaning either "near the border" (with Bentheim) or "near the Es" and sported a church, a marketplace and a fortified aristocratic house.

Enschede was granted city rights around 1300 which were confirmed in 1325 by Bishop Jan III van Diest and henceforth was allowed to protect itself with a wall. Because a stone wall was too expensive (since stone had to be imported), Enschede had a system of ditches, palisades and hedges instead, which is still reflected in the street-names Noorderhagen and Zuiderhagen (North Hedge and South Hedge, respectively). The city plan of this era is still recognisable in the street-pattern. The city was spared destruction in 1597 at its capture during the Eighty Years' War when after a short siege, the Spanish garrison surrendered the city and the defences were razed.

Because the medieval city was largely built of wood and stone houses were the exception, fire was a constant risk and a series of fires in 1517, 1750 and again on 7 May 1862 earned the people from Enschede the nickname Brandstichters (arsonists).

Industrial era 
The last fire coincided with the start of the growth of the city into a large production center for textiles, stimulating a large increase in population, which by 1894 had reached an estimated 18,267: nineteenth-century urban growth was at first rather chaotic. The names of the slums (like De Krim and Sebastopol) are still notorious, although they have long since been torn down. In 1907 the laissez faire mentality was dropped and Enschede was the first city in the Netherlands to draw up an official expansion plan, incorporating the surrounding municipality of Lonneker.

Textile production, originally a cottage industry, reached an industrial scale at the start of the 19th century. In particular, bombazijn (a mixture of cotton and linen) proved a successful export. One such factory to have produced textiles in the late 19th century is the Hardick & Seckel Factory.

World War II 

During World War II, Enschede was one of the first Dutch cities to be captured by German troops, being the city closest to Germany. Resistance members helped many of the Jews from Enschede to hide on farms in the vicinity. Out of approximately 1300 Jews in Enschede, 500 were saved (38.5%), compared to less than 20% in the rest of the Netherlands. This higher survival rate is attributed to three members of the Jewish Council of Enschede, Sig Menko, Gerard Sanders and Isidoor Van Dam who took the initiative, against the advice of the Jewish Council of Amsterdam, of urging their community to go into hiding and not to answer the call-up of the Germans for "labour in the East." Another notable hero of the era was Enschede Pastor Leendert Overduin, who saved hundreds of Jewish children and adults, with help from his sister and others, through a network of safehouses in and around Enschede.

Enschede was bombed on several occasions, most notably on October 10, 1943, and February 22, 1944. During the first raid the nearby airport (then Fliegerhorst Twente) was a target of opportunity for the VIII Bomber Command during a raid on rail- and waterways in Münster. 141 people died and many houses were damaged. The latter mission named Enschede as a target of opportunity during Big Week after bombers had been recalled due to adverse weather.

The end of the industrial age 
In the sixties of the 20th century, the textile industry was completely lost, at the cost of approximately 30,000 jobs. Most of the large factory complexes were demolished in the 1970s and 1980s, some were renovated and given a new purpose. For example, homes were built in the former factories of Jannink and Van Heek. In addition, part of the Jannink complex was converted into a museum. Enschede developed into a service city.

In the 1970s the textile production in Enschede came to a halt, due to fierce competition from mainly the Far East. This had a profound effect on the populace. Enschede became one of the poorest municipalities in the Netherlands and went bankrupt. Large areas of industrial wasteland came to mark the city. With the support of the national government, this property was acquired and rebuilt. The city center was rendered a car-free zone.

In 1961 it was announced a third technical university would be founded, placed on an estate on the western border of Enschede. This green campus called Drienerlo was donated by the city of Enschede. Building was complete in 1964, when the first and only full-facility university of the Netherlands was realised.

On 13 May 2000, a fireworks storage depot in Enschede exploded, destroying part of the neighborhood of Roombeek and killing 23 people, including 4 firemen. In 2001 a referendum confirmed the proposal of the city council to expand the built-up area into the Usseler Es, an area of historic cultural significance and of geological importance, as it was here that the Usselo horizon was discovered. The renovations at Roombeek were finished in the year 2012. The place where the factory used to be is now a monument.

The Alpha Tower was completed in 2008 and this tower block with 91 apartments spread over 29 floors, with a height of 101 meters, is the tallest building in Enschede and the whole province of Overijssel. In the period 1995–2010, Enschede grew by approximately 10,000 inhabitants, but since then the growth has stagnated.

Religion
The largest religion in Enschede is Christianity with 34.9% of the population being Christian.

Enschede has a large Assyrian community, the first Assyrians came to Enschede in the 1970s, primarily from Turkey (Tur Abdin). That is why there are today three Syriac Orthodox Churches in Enschede which meets the spiritual needs of the approximately over 10,000 Assyrians of the city.

During the festivities of Carnival which happens in either February or March, Enschede is renamed as Krekkelstad, which means "cricket town" in English.

Economy 

The city is a former centre of textile production. When this industry left the area for cheaper production centers in South-East Asia, Enschede became one of the poorest municipalities in the Netherlands. More educated and wealthy citizens have historically migrated to the Randstad region; decades of renovation work in the city center have been carried out with the goal of making Enschede more attractive to this group.
Modern shopping centers and department stores that until recently were only found in much larger cities have been opened. Enschede is host to many yearly festivals and the Old Market Square is often the venue for events, live music and other activities on the weekend.

The proximity to Germany has, historically, been another major factor in the city's economic activity, ranging from the smuggling of coffee and tobacco in the 19th and 20th century, to large numbers of Germans, who visit the city's shops and weekly markets. Therefore, many natives of Enschede speak German more or less fluently.

The city is co-operating with the nearby municipalities of Almelo, Borne and Hengelo as Netwerkstad Twente. A draft law plan to merge Enschede with Hengelo and Almelo was defeated in parliament under the influence of opposition from the other towns.

Grolsch beer is brewed in Enschede, and the tyre manufacturer Apollo Vredestein B.V. head office and a factory is in the city. It is one of the most important employers of the region.

Culture

Museum 

There are several museums in Enschede, among them the Rijksmuseum Twenthe for art.  A museum of natural history and a museum dedicated to the history of the textiles industry, both closed in January 2007, have merged, and have reopened in April 2008 in new premises on a new location under the name TwentseWelle (Source/Well of Twente). The new location is situated in Roombeek, where a fireworks disaster took place in 2000. The new museum is located partly in a renovated old textile factory, in reference to Enschede's textile history, and partly in an adjourning new building, designed by the Amsterdam-based firm SeARCH (project architect: Bjarne Mastenbroek). Besides museums there are also several art spaces, the most prominent being Villa de Bank and TETEM. The latter focuses on art and technology, and aims to be accessible for a wide public.
Enschede is also home of The Netherlands Symphony Orchestra.

De Museumfabriek (formerly TwensteWelle) is a museum in the Roombeek district that arose from a merger of three institutions: Natuurmuseum Enschede, Van Deinse Instituut and Fabriekcomplex Jannink. In this museum, the cultural-historical heritage of Twente is linked to the natural-historical heritage, a unique combination for the Netherlands. The museum was opened in April 2008 by the then Queen Beatrix.

Music and Theater 

The German-Dutch relationship is characteristic of music culture, which arose through cooperation in the border region and the dominant textile industry in the 19th and 20th centuries. Especially during the period of reversal after the World War I, a close German-Dutch cultural cooperation developed in Gronau and Enschede, which became increasingly important from string quartets, salon orchestras and hot dance music bands to symphony orchestras and an operetta company ("Enschedesch Opera en Operette Gezelschap") with their own performances. At the same time, jazz also found enthusiastic supporters from 1920 onwards.

The three major concert stages for classical music in Enschede – the Muziekcentrum, the Twentse Schouwburg and the Grote Kerk – have been operating under the name Podium Twente since September 2002 and since September 2011 under the name Wilminktheater en Muziekcentrum Enschede. There is a varied offer of concerts, theater, youth and youth performances and the like to visit.

In November 2008 the Nationaal Muziekkwartier opened its doors in Enschede. A new large theatre, pop stage Atak, the ArtEZ Conservatory, the Orkest van het Oosten (now the Dutch Symphony Orchestra), the Twente Music School, the Nationale Reisopera (now the Nederlandse Reisopera) and Podium Twente (now Wilminktheater en Muziekcentrum Enschede) have settled in this dominant building opposite the Central Station in Enschede. There will be a new large square, the Willem Wilminkplein.

In December 2012, the Serious Request action from national radio station 3FM took place in Enschede, which collected more than 12.2 million euros (almost US$16.2 million).

Other sights gallery

Research, education and health care

The University of Twente (Universiteit Twente), a university with mostly technical studies, is located in Enschede. It is one of the four technical universities in the Netherlands (besides Delft University of Technology, Eindhoven University of Technology and the Wageningen University and Research Centre). The Universiteit Twente is also the only large-campus university in the Netherlands.

The university has courses in pure technical studies such as Applied Physics, Applied Mathematics, Mechanical Engineering, Electrical Engineering, Chemical Engineering, Informatics/Computer Science and Industrial Engineering and also offers study programmes in Communication, Psychology, Economic Sciences, International Business Administration, Public Administration, Applied Medicine and Biomedical Technology; the latter attract a broader public. Since 2006, the programmes of European Studies, Advanced Technology, Creative Technology and ATLAS University College have been added to the university's offerings.

The Faculty of Geo-Information Science and Earth Observation of the University of Twente, with former name International Institute for Aerospace Survey and Earth Sciences, (known by its abbreviation ITC) runs MSc, Master's, Diploma and PhD courses in Geo-Information Science for developing countries. Students from all over the world attend the ITC. Enschede also has an academy of arts and design combined with a conservatory named ArtEZ.

Enschede is also home to one of the three campuses of Saxion University of Applied Sciences (Saxion Hogeschool), a polytechnical school offering internationally recognized Bachelor's degrees and Master's degrees in a wide range of fields, including engineering, economics, social work, investigations and health care. The other campuses are located in Deventer and Apeldoorn.

The Medisch Spectrum Twente (MST) hospital is one of the largest top-clinical hospitals of the Netherlands and features important tertiary care departments, fulfilling a supraregional role. It includes a level I trauma center as well. The hospital is strongly involved in higher medical education, with up to 300 medical students following their internships in the hospital at any given time, closely working together with the University of Twente's Technical Medicine program training a new type of technically specialized doctors.

Transport

Train 

Enschede is a terminus station of the Nederlandse Spoorwegen (NS) railway lines from the west. Trains operate to Hengelo, Almelo, Zwolle, Deventer, Apeldoorn, Amersfoort Centraal, Hilversum, Amsterdam Zuid, Schiphol Airport, Utrecht Centraal and Den Haag Centraal.

To the east there is a line to Gronau, Germany, which has two more stations in the Netherlands: Enschede De Eschmarke and Glanerbrug. The latter two have low ridership. The line is served by 
DB Regionalbahn Westfalen (part of the German Deutsche Bahn), to Münster and to Dortmund, each on an hourly interval and alternating half-hours in the service to Gronau.

There is no track connection between the two systems. The through line had been retained for eventual NATO use during the Cold War even after through passenger service was ended (September 1981), although it was in serious disrepair in later years. With the renewal of service to Germany (May 2001) the track was severed; there is a gap of about 30 centimeters between them.

There is also Enschede Kennispark railway station, near the football stadium.

Bus 

Enschede is situated at the south-east terminus of the Twentekanaal. There is also a network of bus lines connecting nearly every part of the city with the centre. Enschede also has bus connections to nearby towns and cities, like Hengelo, Oldenzaal and south towards Haaksbergen, Neede and Eibergen. The city lines are operated by Syntus, under the Twents-branche. The interlocal lines are exploited by Syntus and Arriva.

Air 
Previously, Enschede had a combined regional civil airport, Enschede Airport, and Airbase Twenthe of the Royal Netherlands Air Force. The latter was closed in 2007; the former was closed in 2008. However, It remains in operation for business air traffic flying via a charter or private jet, and recreational flights.

Roads 
Around the center districts of Enschede is a complete ring road with a length of approximately 8 km, which is popularly called "de singel". This was constructed in the period between 1916 and 1929. Most major arterial roads connect to the canal. Enschede is connected to the national road network by means of the A/N35 and the N18. Below and on the edge of the center are various parking facilities, the most famous and largest of which is the Van Heekgarage, which is located under the Van Heekplein. At the end of 2012, construction of an additional entrance and exit at Kuipersdijk was started as the South entrance. Van Heekgarage is the largest underground parking garage in the Netherlands with a capacity of 1650 cars.

Sports 

Enschede's association football club is FC Twente. Twente were the 2010 Eredivisie champions but were relegated to the second-tier league, the Eerste Divisie, after the 2017-18 season. Since the 2019–2020 season, they are back in the Eredivisie. De Grolsch Veste Stadium is the club's home base and has a capacity of 30,205 spectators.
Enschede has the second oldest marathon in Europe, and the oldest marathon in the Netherlands: the Enschede Marathon. This has been run annually since 1947. Since 2017 there is a new course. The student rowing club D.R.V. Euros has produced several national champions and one Olympic Champion. DOS-WK played until 2006 in the highest competition of korfball, the 'Korfbal League'.Enschede (from Old Church to University) is the final stage of the Batavierenrace, a footrace relay beginning in Nijmegen, contested mostly by university student teams and claimed to be the largest relay races in the world, with 8000 participants. Enschede built the second indoor speed skating arena in the country, IJsbaan Twente.

Twin towns 
Enschede is twinned with:

Notable people 

See also People from Enschede

The Arts 
 Aleida Leurink (1682-1755) Dutch writer
 Édouard Niermans (1859–1928) French architect during the Belle Époque 
 Marilyn Mills (1903–1956) Dutch-born American film actress of the silent era
 Kees van Baaren (1906–1970) Dutch composer and teacher
 Harry Bannink (1929–1999) Dutch composer, arranger and pianist
 Willem Wilmink (1936–2003) Dutch poet and writer
 Jan Cremer (born 1940) Dutch author, photographer and painter
 Jasper van 't Hof (born 1947) Dutch jazz pianist and keyboard player 
 Wilma Landkroon (born 1957) Dutch pop singer
 Natasja Vermeer (born 1973) Dutch model and actress
 Hansje van Halem (born 1978) Dutch graphic designer and type designer
 Bracha van Doesburgh (born 1981) Dutch actress
 Christiaan Kuyvenhoven (born 1985) Dutch classical pianist

Public thinking & Public Service 

 Maurice Frankenhuis (1894–1969) Dutch Jewish businessman, historian, researcher, author, Holocaust survivor and philanthropist; lived in Enschede pre-WW1
 Ankie Stork (ca.1922 – 2015) Dutch resistance fighter during the WWII German occupation
 Kees Boertien (1927–2002) Dutch politician and jurist
 Heiko Wierenga (1933–2013) Dutch politician and Mayor of Enschede 1977 to 1994
 Jan Mans (born 1940) Dutch politician, Mayor of Enschede 1994 to 2005
 Bert Doorn (born 1949) Dutch politician and Member of the European Parliament
 Peter den Oudsten (born 1951) Dutch politician, Mayor of Enschede 2005 to 2014
 Tomás Gómez Franco (born 1968) Spanish politician
 Pepijn van Houwelingen (born 1980) Dutch politician (MP)

Science & Business 

 Hans van Abeelen (1936-1998) first Dutch behavioural geneticist
 Henk J. M. Bos (born 1940) Dutch historian of mathematics
 Paul Polman (born 1956) Dutch businessman with Procter & Gamble, Nestlé and Unilever
 Wiebe Draijer (born 1965) Dutch engineer, civil servant and CEO of the Rabobank.
 Maarten J. M. Christenhusz (born 1976) botanist, natural historian and photographer
 Uğur Üngör (born 1980) academic and scholar of genocide and mass violence, raised in Enschede
 Stijn Hendrikse (born 1971) entrepreneur, businessman

Sports 

 Hans Schnitger (1915–2013) field hockey player, competed in the 1936 Summer Olympics
 Paul Hoekstra (born 1944) Dutch-born, Belgian retired sprint canoeist, silver medalist at the 1964 Summer Olympics
 Jan Jeuring (born 1947) Dutch former professional footballer, 326 club caps with FC Twente
 Johan Reekers (born 1957) Dutch eight time paralympian 
 Henk-Jan Zwolle (born 1964) former rower, team bronze and gold medalist at the 1992 and 1996 Summer Olympics
 Dorien de Vries (born 1965) sailor, bronze medalist at the 1992 Summer Olympics 
 Noor Holsboer (born 1967) field hockey defender, team bronze medalist at the 1988 and 1996 Summer Olympics
 Kirsten Gleis (born 1969) retired female volleyball player, played 241 matches for the NL
 Sander Westerveld (born 1974) former professional football goalkeeper with 440 club caps
 Jeroen Heubach (born 1974) former football player with over 320 club caps
 Bas Nijhuis (born 1977) Dutch football FIFA referee and full-time baker
 Ruud ter Heide (born 1982) former professional football striker with 313 club caps and a killer 
 Rianne Guichelaar (born 1983) water polo player, team gold medalist at the 2008 Summer Olympics 
 Karim El Ahmadi born 1985) Moroccan professional footballer with almost 400 club caps
 Jorien ter Mors (born 1989) Dutch short and long track speed skater; gold medalist at the 2014 and 2018 Winter Olympics
 Mitch Stockentree (born 1991) former professional footballer
 Larry ten Voorde (born 1996) Dutch racing driver and 2-time champion of the Porsche Supercup

References

Literature
 Alfred Hagemann/Elmar Hoff (Hg.): Insel der Träume. Musik in Gronau und Enschede (1895–2005), Klartext-Verlag, Essen 2006.

External links 

 
 
 Tourist Information

 
Cities in the Netherlands
Municipalities of Overijssel
Populated places in Overijssel
Twente
The Holocaust in the Netherlands